Makhtar Thioune (born 5 August 1984) is a Senegalese footballer who plays as a central midfielder for Træff. He has previously played for Sarpsborg 08, Molde and Viking, among others, in Norway, Karlsruher SC in Germany and Şanlıurfaspor in Turkey.

Career
After playing for ASC Linguère and Port Autonome, before he joined Norwegian club Sarpsborg Sparta FK in 2006. After two years in Sarpsborg, Thioune was brought to Molde by head coach Kjell Jonevret and was one of the key players when Molde finished second in the league and the cup in 2009.

In January 2012, he was loaned out to German 2. Bundesliga club Karlsruher SC and returned after the end of Contract on 30 June to Molde FK. He then decided to leave Molde, as he did not get many chances in Ole Gunnar Solskjær's team. Thioune transferred to Viking FK and signed a contract lasting till the end of the 2015-season, and was reunited with his old coach in Molde, Kjell Jonevret.

After a stint with Sanliurfaspor in Turkey, he returned to Norway. After a trial with Egersunds IK he signed for Alta IF. Thioune signed with Norwegian Fourth Division club Hinna Fotball for the 2019 season. He joined Norwegian Third Division side Træff for the 2021 season.

International
Thioune has been capped eleven times for Senegal.

Career statistics

Honours
Individual
 Verdens Gang Norwegian Premier League Player of the Year: 2009

References

External links

1984 births
Living people
Senegalese footballers
Senegal international footballers
ASC Linguère players
Port Autonome players
Sarpsborg 08 FF players
Molde FK players
Karlsruher SC players
Viking FK players
Şanlıurfaspor footballers
Alta IF players
FK Vidar players
Hinna Fotball players
SK Træff players
Norwegian First Division players
Eliteserien players
2. Bundesliga players
TFF First League players
Norwegian Second Division players
Norwegian Fourth Division players
Norwegian Third Division players
Senegalese expatriate footballers
Expatriate footballers in Norway
Expatriate footballers in Germany
Expatriate footballers in Turkey
Senegalese expatriate sportspeople in Norway
Senegalese expatriate sportspeople in Germany
Senegalese expatriate sportspeople in Turkey
Association football midfielders